|}

The Dubai World Cup (Arabic: كأس دبي العالمي) is a Thoroughbred horse race held annually since 1996 and contested at the Meydan Racecourse (Arabic: ميدان) which in Arabic suggests a place where people congregate and compete, a sort of meeting point  in the Emirate of Dubai, United Arab Emirates. The race is operated through the Emirates Racing Authority (ERA) whose Chairman is  Sheikh Mansour bin Zayed Al Nahyan, Minister of Presidential Affairs of the United Arab Emirates. It offers nine races, consisting of eight Thoroughbred contests and one Purebred Arabian contest.

The Dubai World Cup, the final race of Dubai World Cup night, was created in 1996 by Sheikh Mohammed bin Rashid Al Maktoum, Vice President and Prime Minister of the UAE and Ruler of Dubai who owns Darley Stud & Godolphin Racing, one of the world's leading Thoroughbred breeding and racing operations.

Annually held on the last Saturday in March, the Dubai World Cup is part of the Dubai World Cup Night of races. Since its 2019 running, the race has carried a purse of $12 million, regaining its place as the world's richest horse race, a record held by the Pegasus World Cup in 2017 and 2018. It is a Group 1 flat race on dirt for Northern Hemisphere Thoroughbred four-year-olds & up and for Southern Hemisphere Thoroughbred three-year-olds & up run over a distance of 2,000 metres (about 10 furlongs) in late March. It was held at Nad Al Sheba Racecourse before 2009. In 2010, the Dubai World Cup was first held at the new Meydan Racecourse on March 27, on all-weather surface known as Tapeta. However, it was held as dirt race again in 2015 due to the high maintenance cost and  being an unpopular condition among American participants.

The race's first winner was the future United States Hall of Fame Thoroughbred Cigar, owned by Allen E. Paulson. A plaque honoring that horse hangs outside the barn of Bill Mott at Belmont Park.

In 2006 the Dubai World Cup was broadcast live on TVG Network and HRTV and taped later for showing on ABC. It was the first time that the race was shown on national TV in the United States.
The 2020 event was cancelled due to the COVID-19 pandemic.

Records
Speed record:
 2:01.61 (synthetic) - African Story (2014) since the race has been at Meydan Racecourse
 2:01.38 (dirt) - Thunder Snow (2018) since Meydan was converted from synthetic to dirt
 1:59.50 - Dubai Millennium (2000) at Nad Al Sheba Racecourse

Most wins:
 2 - Thunder Snow (2018, 2019)

Most wins by an owner:
 9 - Godolphin Racing (2000, 2002, 2003, 2006, 2012, 2014, 2018, 2019, 2021)

Most wins by a jockey:
 4 - Jerry Bailey (1996, 1997, 2001, 2002)
 4 - Frankie Dettori (2000, 2003, 2006, 2022)

Most wins by a trainer:
 9 - Saeed bin Suroor (1999, 2000, 2002, 2003, 2006, 2014, 2015, 2018, 2019)

Winners

2020 running
The 25th edition of the race was scheduled to take place on 28 March 2020. On 12 March, it was announced that the race would go ahead as planned, but with no spectators in attendance, due to the COVID-19 pandemic. However, on 22 March, a further statement was released, announcing that the race had been cancelled, and that the 25th anniversary celebrations would be postponed until the 2021 running.

Performances
 2012 - Toni Braxton
 2013 - Seal
 2014 - Jennifer Lopez
 2015 - Kylie Minogue
 2016 - Janet Jackson
 2017 - Sia with Maddie Ziegler
 2022 - Becky Hill with Rudimental & Sigala DJ Sets

See also 
 Dubai World Cup Night
 List of United Arab Emirates horse races

References

External links
Official site
 Dubai World Cup 2013  - Dubai Calendar - Dubai Events Official Listing
The National Topics - Dubai World Cup
Official results from the Emirates Racing Authority:1996, 1997, 1998, 1999, 2000, 2001, 2002, 2003, 2004, 2005, 2006, 2007, 2008, 2009
Racing Post

 
Open middle distance horse races
Horse races in the United Arab Emirates
Recurring events established in 1996
Nad Al Sheba Racecourse
Meydan Racecourse
The Emirates Group
1996 establishments in the United Arab Emirates
Dubai World Cup
Dubai World Cup